Abderrahim El Haouzy (born 1 April 1975) is a French sprinter. He specializes in the 400 metres.

El Haouzy was born in Oued Jdida, and represented his birth country of Morocco until 2003.

El Haouzy finished sixth in the 4 × 400 m relay at the 2005 World Championships, together with teammates Leslie Djhone, Naman Keïta and Marc Raquil.

His personal best time is 45.82 seconds, achieved in May 2006 in Brazzaville.

External links

Sports Reference

1975 births
Living people
People from Meknes
French male sprinters
Moroccan male sprinters
Olympic athletes of France
Athletes (track and field) at the 2004 Summer Olympics
World Athletics Championships athletes for France
French sportspeople of Moroccan descent
Mediterranean Games silver medalists for France
Mediterranean Games medalists in athletics
Athletes (track and field) at the 2005 Mediterranean Games